Ulicoten is a village in the Dutch province of North Brabant.

History 
The village was first mentioned in 1422 as Ulencoete, and means "little house/farm on land near water"

The Roman Catholic church was built during the early 19th century, but destroyed in 1944. In 1950, a new church was built with two towers.

Ulicoten was home to 407 people in 1840.

It has a single primary school, Bernardusschool.

Gallery

References

Populated places in North Brabant
Baarle-Nassau